Brentwood station may refer to:
 Brentwood railway station in Brentwood, Essex, England
Brentwood station (Calgary), a CTrain station in Calgary, Alberta, Canada
 Brentwood (LIRR station), a Long Island Rail Road station in Brentwood, New York, United States
 Brentwood Town Centre station, a SkyTrain rapid transit station in Burnaby, British Columbia